Final-obstruent devoicing or terminal devoicing is a systematic phonological process occurring in languages such as Catalan, German, Dutch, Breton, Russian, Polish, Lithuanian, Turkish, and Wolof. In such languages, voiced obstruents in final position (at the end of a word) become voiceless before voiceless consonants and in pausa. The process can be written as *C[+voice] → C[-voice]/__#.

Languages with final-obstruent devoicing

Germanic languages
Most modern continental West Germanic languages developed final devoicing, the earliest evidence appearing in Old Dutch around the 9th or 10th century.

 Afrikaans
 Dutch, also Old and Middle Dutch
 (High) German, also Middle High German
 Gothic (for fricatives)
 Limburgish
 Low German, also Middle Low German
 Luxembourgish (only when not resyllabified)
 Old English (for fricatives, inconsistently for   )
 West Frisian. In contrast, North Frisian (and some Low German dialects in North Frisia that have a Frisian substratum) does not have final devoicing.

In contrast to other continental West Germanic languages, (Eastern)-Yiddish notably does not alter final voiced sounds; this appears to be a later reversal, most probably under Slavic influence. In its earliest recorded example (Yiddish, written evidence), it has final-obstruent devoicing (טַק "tak" instead of "tag" for day.) 

Of the North Germanic languages, Norwegian, Swedish and Danish (the last of which has no voiced obstruents) do not have final devoicing. As in Danish, Icelandic stops are voiceless, but it has voiced fricatives which may also occur word-finally.

Gothic (an East Germanic language) also developed final devoicing independently.

Romance languages
Among the Romance languages, word-final devoicing is common in the Gallo-Romance languages, some of which tend to exhibit strong Frankish influence (itself the ancestor of Old Dutch, above).
 Catalan
 Meridional French
 Friulian
 Lombard
 Occitan
 Romansh

Notes:
 Standard French (by final schwa losses, see above for notes) and Romanian do not have final devoicing, however, varieties of French with substrates of Occitan and Catalan (and other final devoicing languages) do have it. 
 Other Romance languages such as Italian rarely have words with final voiced consonants for different reasons in their phonological histories, but borrowings from English into Italian that have a voiced final consonant (such as weekend) are not devoiced. 

Slavic languages
Most Slavic languages exhibit final devoicing, but notably standard (Štokavian) Serbo-Croatian and Ukrainian do not.
 Belarusian
 Bulgarian
 Czech
 Macedonian
 Polish
 Russian
 Rusyn
 Serbo-Croatian (Kajkavian dialects)
 Slovak
 Slovene
 Sorbian

Other Indo-European languages
 Albanian – certain dialects, notably the dialects of certain areas of the Berati and Korça counties
 Arbëresh
 Breton
 Latgalian
 Lithuanian
 Yaghnobi

Non-Indo-European languages
 Azerbaijani (half-voiced in Iranian Azerbaijan, but unexplained in Azerbaijan proper)
 Georgian (for stops)
 Indonesian (for stops)
 Kalmyk (for stops)
 Khmer
 Korean (nuanced; see Korean phonology)
 Livonian (fully devoiced or half-voiced)
 Lao
 Malaysian (for stops)
 Maltese
 Modern Javanese (for stops)
 Mongolian
 Thai
 Tok Pisin
 Turkish (for stops, partially)

Notes:
 Hungarian, which lies geographically between Germanic- and Slavic- speaking areas, does not have it.

Examples

Dutch and Afrikaans

The history of the devoicing phenomenon within the West Germanic languages is not entirely clear, but the discovery of a runic inscription from the early fifth century suggests that this terminal devoicing originated in Frankish. Of the old West Germanic languages, Old Dutch, a descendant of Frankish, is the earliest to show any kind of devoicing, and final devoicing also occurred in Frankish-influenced Old French.

Amelands, spoken on the Wadden Sea island of Ameland, is the only Dutch dialect that does not feature final-obstruent devoicing.

English
Standard varieties of English do not have phonological final-obstruent devoicing of the type that neutralizes phonemic contrasts; thus pairs like bad and bat are distinct in all major accents of English. Nevertheless, voiced obstruents are devoiced to some extent in final position in English, especially when phrase-final or when followed by a voiceless consonant (for example, bad cat ). Additionally, the voiced alveolar stop /d/ is regularly devoiced in African-American Vernacular English (AAVE).

It can be inferred from the modern pronunciation of half with a voiceless , from an originally voiced fricative  in Proto-Germanic  (preserved in German  and Gothic ).

German
Final-obstruents devoicing occurs in the varieties from Northern Germany. The German contrast between homorganic obstruents is more properly described as a fortis and lenis opposition than an opposition of voiceless and voiced sounds. Therefore, the term devoicing may be misleading, since voice is only an optional feature of German lenis obstruents. By contrast, the German term for the phenomenon, Auslautverhärtung ("final-sound hardening"), refers to fortition rather than devoicing. The German varieties of the north, and many pronunciations of Standard German, involve voice in the distinction between fortis and lenis obstruents however. Final devoicing applies to all plosives and fricatives, and to loan words as well as native words.

Some examples from Northern German include:

Russian
Final-obstruent devoicing can lead to the neutralization of phonemic contrasts in certain environments.

The presence of this process in Russian is also the source of the seemingly variant transliterations of Russian names into -off, especially by the French, as well as older English transcriptions.

Devoicing in compounds
In compounds, the behaviour varies between languages:
 In some languages, devoicing is lexicalized, which means that words that are devoiced in isolation retain that final devoicing when they are part of a compound. In English, for example, there is an alternation between voiced and voiceless fricatives in pairs such as the following:
 thief ([f]) – thieve ([v])
 bath ([θ]) – bathe ([ð]) 

The process is not productive in English, however; see article Consonant voicing and devoicing.
 In other languages, it is purely phonological. which means that voicing depends solely on position and on assimilation with adjacent consonants. Example: German.

Notes

References
 
Brockhaus, Wiebke. (1995). Final Devoicing in the Phonology of German. Max Niemeyer.
 
 
 
Crowley, Terry & Bowern Claire. (2010). An Introduction to Historical Linguistics (Fourth ed.). New York, NY: Oxford University Press.

See also
Consonant voicing and devoicing
Lenition
Surface filter

External links
Final Devoicing or 'Why does <naoi> sound like <naoich>?' – explanation of devoicing with regard to Scottish Gaelic
Final Devoicing – extract (with illustrative audio clips) from Peter Ladefoged's A Course in Phonetics
Final Devoicing  – from The Talking Map | Tips for pronunciation

Phonology
Phonetics
Phonotactics